Nirlep Kaur (1927-1987) was a politician from Punjab, India. She represented Sangrur in the 4th Lok Sabha.

Early life
Born on 11 August 1927 at Patiala in a royal family, Nirlep Kaur was the daughter of Sardar Gian Singh Rarewala, who later on became the first chief minister of Patiala and East Punjab States Union. She did her schooling from the Convent Of Sacred Heart Lahore.

Career
Kaur contested the 1967 Indian general election for the 4th Lok Sabha on the ticket of Akali Dal – Sant Fateh Singh. She defeated the INC candidate by a margin of 98,212 votes. She and Rajmata Mohinder Kaur of Patiala were the first two women from reorganised Punjab to enter the Indian parliament. She had previously been a secretary for Swatantra Party and the president of Mata Sahib Kaur Vidyalaya in Patiala.

Kaur was the first woman who stood in the election for the president of Shiromani Gurdwara Prabandhak Committee, though she lost. In the 1980 Punjab Legislative Assembly election, she contested from Payal but lost to Beant Singh of INC by a difference of 2,936 votes.

Personal life
On 14 March 1942, she married Sardar Rajdev Singh, from whom she has three children. Her house had the first swimming pool in the city of Chandigarh.

References

1927 births
India MPs 1967–1970
Women members of the Lok Sabha
Lok Sabha members from Punjab, India
People from Patiala
Indian National Congress politicians from Punjab, India
Year of death unknown
People from Sangrur district
Shiromani Akali Dal politicians
Swatantra Party politicians